The European Hockey Federation is a European sports federation for field hockey, based in Brussels. It is the umbrella organisation for all European national federations, and organises the Euro Hockey League. Marijke Fleuren was elected president on 22 August 2011. In reaction to the 2022 Russian invasion of Ukraine, the European Hockey Federation banned the participation of all Russian and Belarusian athletes and officials from all events sanctioned by the Federation.

Members association

 Armenia
 Austria
 Azerbaijan
 Belarus
 Belgium
 Bulgaria
 Croatia
 Cyprus
 Czech Republic
 Denmark
 England
 Estonia
 Finland
 France
 Georgia
 Germany
 Gibraltar
 Greece
 Great Britain
 Hungary
 Ireland
 Israel
 Italy
 Lithuania
 Luxembourg
 Macedonia
 Malta
 Moldova
 Netherlands
 Norway
 Poland
 Portugal
 Romania
 Russia
 Scotland
 Serbia
 Slovakia
 Slovenia
 Spain
 Sweden
 Switzerland
 Turkey
 Ukraine
 Wales

Outdoor EHF competitions

Clubs
Euro Hockey League
Women's Euro Hockey League
Men's EuroHockey Club Trophy I
Men's EuroHockey Club Trophy II
Women's EuroHockey Club Trophy
EuroHockey Club Challenge

Defunct
EuroHockey Club Champions Cup
EuroHockey Club Champions Cup (women)
EuroHockey Cup Winners Cup
EuroHockey Cup Winners Trophy
EuroHockey Cup Winners Challenge

National teams
Men's EuroHockey Championship
Women's EuroHockey Championship
Men's EuroHockey Championship II
Women's EuroHockey Championship II
Men's EuroHockey Championship III
Women's EuroHockey Championship III
EuroHockey Championship IV
Men's EuroHockey Junior Championship
Women's EuroHockey Junior Championship
EuroHockey Youth Championship
EuroHockey U16 Championship
European Hockey 5s tournament
Southeast European Hockey 5's Championship - Boys & Girls U15

Defunct
Pannonia Cup
Celtic Cup
Junior Celtic Cup
Alps Cup
Nordic Championships

Indoor EHF competitions

Clubs
Men's EuroHockey Indoor Club Cup
Women's EuroHockey Indoor Club Cup
EuroHockey Indoor Club Trophy
EuroHockey Indoor Club Challenge

National teams
Men's EuroHockey Indoor Championship
Women's EuroHockey Indoor Championship
Men's EuroHockey Indoor Championship II
Women's EuroHockey Indoor Championship II
EuroHockey Indoor Junior Championship

National team rankings

Notes

References

External links
Official website
All results 

 
Field hockey organizations
Organisations based in Brussels
Sport in Brussels
Field